Oleksiy Shvidkiy (born 10 March 1986) is a cross-country skier from Ukraine.

Performances

External links

1986 births
Living people
S
Tour de Ski skiers